Zontanoi Nekroi ("Living Dead") is a Greek rap group formed in 1997. The members are Taki Tsan, Midenistis, Katahthonios, Ypohthonios, and Harmanis.

Formation
At a concert of the hip hop group Terror X Crew in 1997 at the Camel Club–Athens, a police raid took place and almost everybody in the concert (even the band) were taken to the police station of Piraeus. Terror X Crew's DJ ALX's brother, Panagiotis Stravalexis and rapper Panos Bougas met there, and decided to form a hip hop group. The two of them first started as the Gate of the Living Dead. Stravalexis took the pseudonym Timvorihos - Grave Robber (under alias; Taki Tsan) and Bougas took the name Midenistis - Nihilist. Eventually they changed the band's name to Zontanoi Nekroi along with recruiting rappers for the group. Ipohthonios, Katahthonios and Harmanis are the aliases of the three new members who completed the group.

Albums
They released the EP ZN Entoles in early 1998, and later that year their only album O Protos Tomos. Following the release of Protos Tomos, most members of the group went to pursue solo careers. Stravalexis changed his alias to Pedi Thavma and released an LP called Rima gia Hrima in 1999. In 2000, ZN started recording Kata.R.Ipo, a duet album by Ipohthonios and Katahthonios, but never released it. In 2001, they were working on Harmanis' debut solo named Sisihaha which was never released too. Having collected several unreleased songs, they released a compilation album named Thammena Ksehasmena which contained songs from Kata.R.Ipo, a song that did not fit in Rima gia Hrima, the first track that was recorded for Megalos Iroas, Midenistis' first solo album, and some alternate editions of old songs. The group informally disbanded after the release of Midenistis LP Megalos Iroas in 2002. In 2008 they formed up again and gave some concerts. During one of their concerts they announced that they are working on Defteros Tomos. ZN continued to work together as they recorded some songs for Taki Tsan's 2009 LP "Rima gia Hrima 2". Although Defteros Tomos was supposed to be released in 2010 it has yet to be seen. Due to this, it is widely rumored that the group has disbanded and they all returned to their solo careers. After their supposed hiatus Midenistis and Ipohthonios went mainstream. In September 2014 though after Taki Tsan publicly called out the other members and after their acceptance, they are expected to record Defteros Tomos.

Discography
 ZN Entoles/Sti Hora Ton Kaliteron MCs, EP, FM Records/Ihokratoria (1998) 
 O Protos Tomos, LP, FM Records/Ihokratoria (1998) 
 Thamena Ksehasmena, Compilation, FM Records/Ihokratoria (2001)
 The Rare And Unreleased Songs, Mixtape, Gus Productions (2009)
 The Rare And Unreleased Songs Vol. 2, Mixtape, Gus Productions (2009)
 Pasa Doumania/Paresthisis, EP, Ihokratoria (2015)

Solo discography
 Stin Athina, CD Single, FM Records/Ihokratoria (1999) by Taki Tsan (as Pedi Thavma)
 Rima Gia Hrima, LP, FM Records/Ihokratoria (1999) by Taki Tsan (as Pedi Thavma)
 Megalos Iroas, LP, FM Records/Ihokratoria (2002) by Midenistis
 Stihi San Fotia, CD, FM Records (2004) by Midenistis
 Siatista, Mixtape, No Label (2004) by Ipohthonios 
 Mixtape Vol.0, Mixtape, hiphop.gr (2005) by Taki Tsan
 Mixtape Vol.1, Mixtape, newstyle.gr (2005) by Taki Tsan
 Mixtape Vol.2: Misa Lefta/Dipli Maggia, Mixtape, IhoSpira (2005) by Taki Tsan
 To Pedi Tou Dromou, Mixtape, No label (2005) by Ipohthonios
 Sto Mialo Tou Panagioti Stravaleksi, LP, IhoSpira/FM Records (2006) by Taki Tsan
 Kane Ntou, Single, Minos EMI (2007) by Ipohthonios 
 Pion Akous, CD, Minos EMI (2008) by Ipohthonios
 To Kalitero Deal, Single, Minos EMI (2008) by Katahthonios
 KommaTia Laska, Mixtape, No label (2008) by Harmanis
 50/50, CD, Minos EMI (2008) by Midenistis
 In' O Man, CD, Sporty Magazine (2009) by Taki Tsan
 Kommatia Harma, Mixtape, No Label (2009) by Harmanis
 Uno, Single, No Label (2009) by Ipohthonios 
 Rima gia Hrima 2, 2 CD's, Ihokratoria/RAP Monster (2009) by Taki Tsan
 Vromiko, Mixtape, No Label (2010) by Ipohthonios 
 Exclusive Mixtape, Mixtape, takitsan.com (2011) by Taki Tsan
 Athens' Finest, Mixtape, takitsan.com (2011) by Taki Tsan
 To Mialo Mou Girnaei, Single, Spicy Records (2011) by Ipohthonios 
 Mia Zografia, Single, Panik Records (2011) by Midenistis with Demy 
 Vrehi Fragga, Mixtape, Capital Music (2012) by Ipohthonios
 To Party Den Stamata, Single, Panik Records (2012) by Midenistis with Eleni Foureira 
 Zo Ti Stigmi, Single, Panik Records (2012) by Midenistis 
 Kala Koritsia, Single, Panik Records (2012) by Midenistis 
 Se Ena Tiho, Single, Panik Records (2012) by Midenistis with Michalis Hadjiyiannis 
 Prodotis, Single, Capital Music (2013) by Ipohthonios 
 Oli Mazi, Single, Panik Records (2013) by Midenistis 
 S Agapao, Single, Panik Records (2013) by Midenistis with Tamta
 Etos 2013, Single, Panik Records (2013) by Midenistis 
 To Sistima, EP, Ihokratoria/33 1/3 Entertainment (2014) by Taki Tsan 
 Se Ena Aggelo Milo, Single, Panik Records (2014) by Midenistis with Yiannis Vardis  
 Panik Boys, Single, Panik Records (2014) by Midenistis with Snik 
 Ta Kalitera, Single, Panik Records (2014) by Midenistis with Kostas Martakis 
 Colombiano, Single, Capital Music (2015) by Ipohthonios 
 Pacman, Single, Capital Music (2015) by Ipohthonios 
 To Poto, Single, Panik Records (2015) by Midenistis 
 Zoo, Single, Panik Records (2015) by Midenistis 
 Maradona, Single, Capital Music (2016) by Ipohthonios 
 Ola Auta Pou Tha Thela, Single, No Label (2016) by Midenistis 
 Eho / Ta Sporia Mas, Single, No Label (2016) by Midenistis 
 Allos Enas, Single, Athens Mob Records (2016) by Taki Tsan with Rack 
 Ipopta, Single, Athens Mob Records (2016) by Taki Tsan 
 Tzogadoros, Single, Athens Mob Records (2016) by Taki Tsan 
 Allazo Styl, Single, Athens Mob Records (2017) by Taki Tsan 
 Demos 4 Memos, Mixtape, Athens Mob Records (2017) by Taki Tsan (as DJ Westley) 
 Peru, Single, Capital Music (2017) by Ipohthonios 
 Eleni Vitali, Single, Capital Music (2017) by Ipohthonios
 Logia Alithina, Single, Athens Mob Records (2017) by Taki Tsan

Other projects
 Theoria Kai Praxi, LP, FM Records/Ihokratoria (2003) by Tigre Sporakia (Taki Tsan & Isvoleas) 
 To Sholio, LP, FM Records/Ihokratoria (2004) by Harmanis & Taki Tsan 
 Sta Paidia, Single, No Label (2009) by Taki Tsan & Diezel 
 High Oso Den Paei, Single, Polla Kila Entertainment (2010) by Harmanis & Billy Sio with Taki Tsan 
 To Styl Mou, Single, Polla Kila Entertainment (2011) by Harmanis & Billy Sio 
 Onoma Kai Pragma, LP, No Label (2011) by Tigre Sporakia (Taki Tsan & Isvoleas) 
 Trilogia, EP, Capital Music (2013) by Ipohthonios & Skive
 Thelei Na Dineis Tin Psihi Sou Gi Auto, Single, Ihokratoria (2013) by Taki Tsan & Kebzer 
 Alli Fasi, Single, Ihokratoria (2013) by Taki Tsan & Kebzer 
 Den Einai Anagki, Single, Ihokratoria (2014) by Taki Tsan & Kanon
 Skame Sta Mavra, Single, RNS Records (2016) by Taki Tsan & Thitis

External links
 Official Homepage of ZN
 

Greek hip hop groups
Musical groups from Athens